Shuck may refer to:

The chaff sections of grains
Black Shuck, mythical dog
Shuckin' and jivin'
"Shuck", a song by Purity Ring from their debut album, Shrines (2012)

People
Glenn Shuck, American academic
Henrietta Hall Shuck, American missionary
J. B. Shuck, baseball player
Jim Shuck, American football player
Ryan Shuck, guitarist
William E. Shuck, Jr., Medal of Honor recipient